Vincent Johnson (born January 6, 1969), is an American serial killer popularly known as The Brooklyn Strangler. He was previously a marketing photographer for ad firm, Gannett Transit, in the early 1990s.

Arrest
Between the summers of 1999 and 2000, a series of murders of prostitutes in the Williamsburg and Bedford-Stuyvesant neighborhoods of Brooklyn led police to arrest a Brooklyn homeless man, one of roughly 30 known associates of prostitutes in the area detained for questioning, on suspicion of the murders.  However, DNA testing definitively excluded the man as the killer.

After he was cleared as a suspect, the man befriended the officers of the Brooklyn North Homicide Task Force who were working the Brooklyn Strangler case.  He told them of another homeless man in the area, with whom he frequently used crack cocaine, who seemed fixated on sadomasochistic sex.  The man was subsequently able to identify this suspect, Vincent Johnson, 5'3" (1.6 m) and 130 lb (59 kg).

Johnson initially refused to provide a DNA sample to police, and denied knowing any of the women.  However, one of the detectives had observed him spitting on the street, and Johnson's saliva was retrieved and given to the medical examiner for testing.  Johnson's DNA matched that which was found on four of the victims.

Johnson later confessed to the murders of five women: Patricia Sullivan, Rhonda Tucker, Joanne Feliciano, Vivian Caraballo and Laura Nusser, all of whom had arrest records for prostitution and drug offenses, and were themselves addicts.  He remained a suspect in the murder of Katrina Niles, although, as of 2006, he continues to deny involvement in her death. Police consider it likely he had sex with at least three of his victims.

Johnson reportedly claimed he was acting out a hatred of his mother.  Three of the victims — Caraballo, Feliciano and Sullivan — were killed on Thursdays, and Rhonda Tucker probably was as well, although her body was discovered on a Saturday.  According to Johnson, this deliberate fixation came about due to his loathing of his mother's one day off from work, always a Thursday.

Johnson admitted little, if any, feelings of guilt.  Of Patricia Sullivan, he said, "I didn't see strangling her as doing something wrong at the time"; although after killing his first victim, Laura Nusser, he said he reported feeling "sorry" and wanting to apologize to her family.

Each of the victims was strangled, apparently with whatever ligature was at hand: two with their own shoelaces, one with a drawstring from a pair of sweatpants, two with electrical wire and one with what was probably a discarded piece of cloth. Johnson bound their bodies with the ligatures, but did not attempt to hide them. The women were left where they were killed, two on rooftops and one in a vacant lot in roughly the same vicinity in Williamsburg, two in apartments in Bedford-Stuyvesant, and one in a utility room under the Williamsburg Bridge, where Johnson was known to have slept occasionally on a cot.

Johnson is currently serving a life sentence without parole in Wende Correctional Facility in Alden, New York.

Other media
The pursuit of the Brooklyn Strangler, and Johnson's subsequent arrest for the crimes, was the subject of several episodes of the Court TV documentary series Brooklyn North.

See also 
 List of serial killers in the United States

References

External links
New York State inmate search (Johnson's DIN# is 01A2526)

1969 births
American people convicted of murder
American prisoners sentenced to life imprisonment
American serial killers
Crimes against sex workers in the United States
Living people
Male serial killers
People convicted of murder by New York (state)
People from Brooklyn
Place of birth missing (living people)
Prisoners sentenced to life imprisonment by New York (state)